In typography, the ransom note effect is the result of using an excessive number of juxtaposed typefaces.  It takes its name from the appearance of a stereotypical ransom note, with the message formed from words or letters cut randomly from a magazine or newspaper in order to avoid using recognizable handwriting.  The term is also used to describe poor typesetting or layout created by an untrained Web developer or desktop publishing user, but the problem is recognized in classical typography, which cites handbills from the 18th and 19th centuries as particular examples. 

Early versions of Macintosh system software, up through System 7, included a bitmapped font called San Francisco that replicated the ransom note effect. The font was not carried over into later versions of Mac OS. Microsoft similarly had a Ransom typeface commissioned in 1992.

The ransom note effect may also occur when a web browser uses different fonts to display parts of a web page in different languages or encodings (or if a language uses glyphs from different code blocks, as is the case with Ancient Greek). To avoid this, web browsers try to use the same font for as much of the page as possible.

See also
 Poison pen letter

References 

Typography